Joseph Thomas was a South African boxer. He competed in the men's welterweight event at the 1920 Summer Olympics.

References

Year of birth missing
Year of death missing
Welterweight boxers
South African male boxers
Olympic boxers of South Africa
Boxers at the 1920 Summer Olympics
Place of birth missing